Odunboğazı, Şereflikoçhisar is a village in the District of Şereflikoçhisar, Ankara Province, Turkey.  The village is populated by Kurds.

References

Villages in Şereflikoçhisar District

Kurdish settlements in Ankara Province